Orville Lee (born April 4, 1964) is a retired Canadian Football League running back.

He was drafted by the Ottawa Rough Riders with the first overall pick in the 1988 CFL Draft from Simon Fraser University. In his rookie year he racked up 1075 rushing yards to lead the CFL becoming only the fifth Canadian (Normie Kwong, Gerry James, Bob Swift and Ron Stewart being the others) to accomplish that feat. He later played for the Saskatchewan Roughriders and Hamilton Tiger-Cats before retiring in 1992. His son, Jamall Lee was a member of the BC Lions.

He now runs a non-profit organization called Pathfinder Youth Center Society, for at Risk Kids in BC along with his wife Ruth Lee.

References

Living people
1964 births
Canadian football running backs
Canadian players of Canadian football
Jamaican players of Canadian football
Hamilton Tiger-Cats players
Ottawa Rough Riders players
Saskatchewan Roughriders players
Simon Fraser Clan football players
Canadian Football League Rookie of the Year Award winners
People from Saint Ann Parish
Jamaican emigrants to Canada